The 2000 Mid-Eastern Athletic Conference men's basketball tournament took place March 6–11, 2000, at the Arthur Ashe Athletic Center in Richmond, Virginia. South Carolina State defeated , 70–53 in the championship game, to win its fourth MEAC Tournament title. The Bulldogs earned an automatic bid to the 2000 NCAA tournament as No. 16 seed in the South region. In the round of 64, South Carolina State fell to No. 1 seed Stanford 84–65.

Format
All eleven conference members participated, with the top 5 teams receiving a bye to the quarterfinal round. After seeds 6 through 11 completed games in the first round, teams were re-seeded. The lowest remaining seed was slotted against the top seed, next lowest remaining faced the #2 seed, and third lowest remaining seed squared off against the #3 seed.

Bracket

References

MEAC men's basketball tournament
1999–2000 Mid-Eastern Athletic Conference men's basketball season
MEAC men's basketball tournament
Basketball competitions in Richmond, Virginia
College basketball tournaments in Virginia